Two Indians Talking (initially titled Discussing Mr. Darcy) is a 2010 Canadian comedy-drama film directed by Sara McIntyre, starring Nathaniel Arcand, Justin Rain, Carmen Moore, Denyc, Sam Bob and Ashley Harry.

Cast
 Nathaniel Arcand as Nathan
 Justin Rain as Adam
 Carmen Moore as Sue
 Denyc as Tara
 Sam Bob as Arthur
 Ashley Harry as Janine

Release
The film premiered at the Vancouver International Film Festival on 6 October 2010.

Reception
Rob Nelson of Variety wrote that the film "benefits immeasurably from Andrew Genaille’s peppy writing and the nimble direction of Sara McIntyre, who keeps the comedic drama visually compelling despite its being set mostly in a single room."

Glen Schaefer of The Province gave the film a grade of "C" and wrote that the film "plays more like a series of interconnected essays than as on-screen drama." Sara McIntyre of The Globe and Mail rated the film 2 stars out of 4 and wrote that it "feels a little forced, a little too preachy, and there are some real eye-rolling moments".

References

External links
 
 

2010 films
Canadian comedy-drama films
2010 comedy-drama films
First Nations films